William "Bill" D. Drake (20 February 1931 – 8 October 2012) was an English professional rugby league footballer who played in the 1950s and 1960s. He played at representative level for Great Britain, England and Cumberland, and at club level for Heworth A.R.L.F.C., Hull FC, Leeds and York as a back, and later a forward, during the era of contested scrums.

Background
Bill Drake was born in Workington, Cumberland, and was the younger (by 10-minutes) twin brother of fellow rugby league footballer; Jim Drake, exactly four years to the day after the death of his twin brother Jim Drake, Bill Drake died aged 81 in York Hospital, North Yorkshire, England.

Playing career
Drake won 10-caps for Cumberland from 1953, and played in Hull FC's 10-9 victory over Halifax in the Championship Final during the 1955–56 season at Maine Road, Manchester on Saturday 12 May 1956. He played right-, i.e. number 12, in Hull FC's 13-30 defeat by Wigan in the 1958–59 Challenge Cup Final during the 1958–59 season at Wembley Stadium, London on Saturday 9 May 1959. Drake missed the 1959–60 Challenge Cup Final during the 1959–60 season though injury, being replaced by Mike Smith who became the first player to ever make a first team début in a Challenge Cup Final.

Drake won a cap for England while at Hull in 1962 against France, and won a cap for Great Britain while at Hull in 1962 also against France.

Drake was transferred from Hull to Leeds in 1963 for £1,500 (based on increases in average earnings, this would be approximately £56,890 in 2013).

Drake played left-, i.e. number 8, in Leeds' 2-18 defeat by Wakefield Trinity in the 1964–65 Yorkshire County Cup Final during the 1964–65 season at Fartown Ground, Huddersfield on Saturday 31 October 1964.

References

External links
(archived by web.archive.org) Stats → Past Players → D at hullfc.com (statistics for player surnames beginning with 'C' and 'D' swapped)
(archived by web.archive.org) Statistics at hullfc.com
(archived by web.archive.org) Tributes to Hull FC great Bill Drake
(archived by web.archive.org) Bill Drake – A Supporter's Appreciation

1931 births
2012 deaths
Cumberland rugby league team players
England national rugby league team players
English rugby league players
Great Britain national rugby league team players
Hull F.C. players
Leeds Rhinos players
Rugby league players from Workington
Rugby league props
Rugby league second-rows
Rugby league wingers
Twin sportspeople
English twins
York Wasps players